is a Japanese semiconductor company, manufacturing silicon wafers for semiconductor manufacturers worldwide. The company was established in 1999 as a joint venture between Mitsubishi Materials Corporation and Sumitomo Metal Industries and as of 2013 is the second largest silicon wafer producer in the world, after Shin-Etsu Handotai, with a market share of 30%.

SUMCO is listed on the first section of the Tokyo Stock Exchange and is a constituent of the Nikkei 225 stock index.

Products
The company manufactures the following products:
 Single crystal silicon ingots
 Polished wafers
 Annealed wafers
 Epitaxial wafers
 Junction isolated wafers
 Silicon-on-Insulator (SOI) wafers
 Reclaimed polished wafers

References

External links

 

Manufacturing companies based in Tokyo
Silicon wafer producers
Semiconductor companies of Japan
Companies listed on the Tokyo Stock Exchange
Electronics companies established in 1999
Japanese companies established in 1999
Japanese brands